Industry 2.0 is a monthly science and technology magazine published by 9.9 Media in New Delhi.

History and profile
Industry 2.0 was started in 2001. It features a judicious mix of in-depth stories, recent events and happenings, incisive commentary, case studies, and in-depth discussions. Industry 2.0 engagesin industry and technology leaders to provide a comprehensive overview of the manufacturing sector. The magazine is based in New Delhi.

References

9.9 Media Products
English-language magazines published in India
Monthly magazines published in India
Magazines established in 2001
Science and technology magazines published in India
Magazines published in Delhi
2001 establishments in Delhi